Sayyid Hassan Ghazizadeh Hashemi (born 21 March 1959) is an Iranian ophthalmologist and associate professor of Tehran University of Medical Sciences, who served as the Minister of Health and Medical Education from 2013 to 2019 in the administration of President Hassan Rouhani.

He has previously served as an advisor to former minister Mohammad Farhadi from 1997 to 2001 and Chancellor of the Tehran University of Medical Sciences, School of Medicine.

Ghazizadeh Hashemi is known as the designer of "Health evolution plan", also called “Rouhani-Care”, a plan designed to reform Iran's Healthcare system by "granting the public fair access to healthcare, enhance equity, cover health costs and promote the quality of healthcare services that people receive". He resigned on 28 December 2018 in protest to next year's medical budget. His resignation was accepted on 3 January 2019 by Rouhani.

Hashemi is also head of Noor Ophthalmology Complex, which he founded in 1993 and a co-founder of "Nooravaran Salamat Charity Foundation", a philanthropic NGO which provides free healthcare and surgeries to people in deprived parts of Iran via mobile clinics.

Education 
Ant segment and  Cornea Fellowship, Shahid Beheshti University of Medical Sciences (1991) 
Ophthalmology, Mashhad University of Medical Sciences (1989)
Medical Doctorate, Mashhad University of Medical Sciences (1985)

References

External links 

Official website 

Government ministers of Iran
People from Khorasan
1959 births
Living people
Iranian ophthalmologists
Iranian philanthropists
Academic staff of Tehran University of Medical Sciences
Jihad of Construction personnel of the Iran–Iraq War